The International Standard Wine Number or ISWN, similar to the ISBN for books, was a coding scheme intended to give a unique identifier for each wine worldwide. The ISWN system had a consistent unique code for each wine producer (ISWN-P), each wine brand or product (ISWN-W), each vintage variant of a wine product (ISWN-V), and the bottle variants (ISWN-B). The ISWN was allocated by the ISWN Organization on the basis of a global reference database of wine producers and wines worldwide. The database was improved through wine producers updating their own data with the ISWN Manager module. The ISWN Organization was a Non-profit organization sponsored by the wine industry.

References

External links
International Standard Wine Number archived web page

Identifiers
Wine terminology